Diego Gustavo Ferraresso Scheda (born May 21, 1992), sometimes known as just Diego, is a Brazilian professional footballer who plays as a full-back for Bulgarian First League club Botev Vratsa.

Career
Diego Ferraresso started to play football in a private junior school of São Paulo. He comes from a poor family.

Litex Lovech 
He moved to Bulgaria, joining Litex Lovech's academy, after catching the eye of the player agent Rogério Pereira. Ferares made his team debut for Litex Lovech in a friendly match against Macedonian FK Pelister on July 1, 2008. In his first months with Litex, Diego Ferraresso played for the reserve squad. Diego's first official match was against PFC Belasitsa Petrich on May 15, 2009. He entered as a substitution in the 78 minute and scored his first goal for Litex. On June 14, 2009, Diego Ferraresso scored a hat-trick against Spartak Varna. He ended the 2008–09 season with 5 goals in 4 league matches.

Chavdar Etropole 
After two seasons in Litex Lovech in 2011 he joined to "B" group team Chavdar Etropole. He played two seasons, made 36 caps and scored six goals.

In the summer of 2012, Ferraresso spent approximately a month training with Botev Plovdiv, receiving the approval of the manager Ferario Spasov. However, the "canaries" were unable to sign him, as with his transfer they would have exceeded the limit on non-EU players in the team.

Lokomotiv Plovdiv 
For 2012–13 season, he signed with Lokomotiv Plovdiv.

Botev Vratsa 
After a five-year stay with Cracovia, in September 2021 Diego Ferraresso returned to Bulgaria, being close to signing with Dobrudzha Dobrich, but eventually joining Botev Vratsa that was managed by compatriot Daniel Morales.

International career
In June 2012, Diego Ferraresso received Bulgarian citizenship after he had lived in the country for five years. Same year he received a call up for a training camp of Bulgaria U21. In an interview for the Brazilian web magazine Medium in April 2018, Diego showed his desire to represent Bulgaria on international level and to play in the FIFA World Cup with the team.

Career statistics

Club

Honours

Club
Litex Lovech
 Bulgarian A Group: 2009–10
 Bulgarian Supercup: 2010

Cracovia
 Polish Cup: 2019–20
 Polish Supercup: 2020

References

External links
 
 

1992 births
Living people
Brazilian footballers
Brazilian emigrants to Bulgaria
Naturalised citizens of Bulgaria
PFC Litex Lovech players
FC Chavdar Etropole players
PFC Lokomotiv Plovdiv players
PFC Slavia Sofia players
MKS Cracovia (football) players
First Professional Football League (Bulgaria) players
Ekstraklasa players
Footballers from São Paulo (state)
Expatriate footballers in Bulgaria
Brazilian expatriate sportspeople in Bulgaria
Expatriate footballers in Poland
Brazilian expatriates in Poland
Association football defenders 
Association football midfielders